PlayStation Magazine, also known by the acronym PSM, is an Italian video game magazine specializing in all Sony video game consoles and handheld gaming platforms. The magazine features previews, reviews, and cheat codes for Sony games.

History
Launched in 1997 as the official Italian magazine of Sony Computer Entertainment, the magazine was owned by a division of Future Publishing, Future Media Italy, until March 2007 when Sprea Media Italy acquired it. The first issue of the magazine was published in September 1997.

References

External links
 PlayStation Magazine on Sprea Media Italy corporate site 

1997 establishments in Italy
Italian-language magazines
Magazines established in 1997
Magazines published in Milan
Monthly magazines published in Italy
PlayStation (brand) magazines
Video game magazines published in Italy